Daniel Roullier (born 14 November 1935) is a French billionaire businessman, and the founder of Groupe Roullier, and agribusiness conglomerate.

Early life
Daniel Roullier was born on 14 November 1935 in Landébia, France. He grew up in Saint-Malo, France.

Career
In 1959, Roullier bought a seaweed deposit close to Saint-Malo, and founded Timac to convert this marine limestone into a soil conditioner. This company has expanded ever since and is now known as Groupe Roullier.

Personal life
Roullier lives in St. Malo. One of his daughters have senior roles in the company.

References

1935 births
French billionaires
French company founders
French chief executives
People from Saint-Malo
Living people